Mutantes Ao Vivo is the seventh album by the Brazilian band Os Mutantes and their first live album, with only new material on it. Like its predecessor, Tudo Foi Feito Pelo Sol, the only original member of the band to take part in this album is guitarist Sérgio Dias. Mutantes Ao Vivo is the final Os Mutantes' album until the band's 2006 reunion at London's Barbican Theatre.

Track listing
 "Anjos do Sul" - 2:39 - (Sérgio Dias)   
 "Benvindos / Mistérios" - 4:15 - (Sérgio Dias) / (Sérgio Dias)   
 "Trem / Dança dos Ventos" - 3:30 - (Paulo de Castro) / (Mutantes)   
 "Sagitarius" - 5:35 - (Sérgio Dias)   
 "Esquizofrenia" - 2:55 - (Sérgio Dias)   
 "Rio de Janeiro" - 3:38 - (Sérgio Dias / Túlio Mourão)   
 "Loucura Pouca é Bobagem" - 4:20- (Luciano Alves / Sérgio Dias)
 "Hey Tu" - 2:55- (Sérgio Dias / Paulo de Castro)
 "Rock'n Roll City" - 6:30- (Sérgio Dias)
 "Tudo Explodindo" - 4:12- (Luciano Alves / Sérgio Dias)
 "Grand Finale" - 2:05- (Luciano Alves / Sérgio Dias)
 "Anjos do Sul" - 1:50 - (Sérgio Dias)

Bonus track on 2006 CD reissue

 "Cidadão da Terra" (Sérgio Dias / Liminha)

Personnel

 Sérgio Dias: guitars, vocals, sitar
 Rui Motta: drums, percussion
 Luciano Alves: keyboards, vocals
 Paulo de Castro: bass, vocals
 

Os Mutantes albums
1976 live albums
Live progressive rock albums